Eugnosta fenestrana is a species of moth of the family Tortricidae. It is found in China (Beijing, Jilin, Qinghai), Mongolia and Russia.

References

Moths described in 1964
Eugnosta